Cansfield is a surname. Notable people with the surname include:

Donna Cansfield (born  1945), Canadian politician
Joyce Cansfield (1929–2019), British crossword compiler

See also
Canfield (surname)